The Education, Science, Health and Sports Committee of the Chinese People's Political Consultative Conference is one of ten special committees of the Chinese People's Political Consultative Conference, China's top political advisory body and a central part of the Chinese Communist Party's united front system.

History 
The committee was created in June 1988 during the 7th Chinese People's Political Consultative Conference. In 2018, it was renamed from the Committee of Education, Science, Culture, Health and Sports to the Committee of Education, Science, Health and Sports.

List of chairpersons

References 

Special committees of the Chinese People's Political Consultative Conference
Organizations established in 1988
1988 establishments in China